Kayla Jean Harrison (born July 2, 1990) is an American professional mixed martial artist and former Olympic and world champion judoka, currently signed to the Professional Fighters League (PFL).

Harrison competed in the  weight category in judo. She won the 2010 World Judo Championships, gold medals at the 2012 and 2016 Olympics, and gold at the 2011 and 2015 Pan American Games.

After the 2016 Olympics, she moved into mixed martial arts and currently fights in the lightweight division. In March 2023, Harrison was inducted into the International Sports Hall of Fame.

Early life
Born in Middletown, Ohio, Harrison took up judo at the age of six, having been introduced to the sport by her mother, who was a black belt. She graduated from Middletown High School (Ohio).

She began training under coach Daniel Doyle, and won two national championships by the age of 15. During that period Doyle was sexually abusing Harrison, who reported it to another judoka, who in turn told Harrison's mother. She subsequently reported this to the police. Doyle was convicted and sentenced to a ten-year prison term. A month after the abuse was revealed, she moved away from her home in Ohio to Boston to train with Jimmy Pedro and his father.

Career

Judo
She changed weight classes in 2008, from the −63 kg division to the 78 kg division. She could not compete in the 2008 Summer Olympics as the United States had not qualified in that division. She won the Junior World Championship that year, and the following year placed second, becoming the first American to compete in two Junior World Championships finals.

She won the gold medal in the −78 kg category at the World Judo Championships in 2010, the first American to do so since 1999 (when her coach, Jimmy Pedro, did so in Birmingham, United Kingdom). At the 2011 World Judo Championship in Paris, she placed third taking the bronze medal. Harrison had lost to the eventual winner, Audrey Tcheuméo of France, in her semi-final.

Prior to the 2012 Summer Olympics in London, she was injured during training, having torn a medial collateral ligament. On August 2, 2012, she won the Olympic title in the −78 kg category, defeating Gemma Gibbons of Britain by two yukos, to become the first American to win an Olympic gold medal in judo. She earned a second Olympic gold medal in the same weight class in 2016 in Rio, defeating Audrey Tcheuméo of France.

In 2015, Harrison was elected to the United States Judo Federation Hall Of Fame and on August 31, 2016, following her second Olympic gold medal, the United States Judo Association made a batsugun promotion of Harrison to rokudan (6th Degree Black Belt) making her the youngest person in the US to ever be awarded this rank.

Mixed martial arts
Harrison, a former training partner of fellow judoka Ronda Rousey, announced in October 2016 that she had signed with World Series of Fighting. While she would initially work as a commentator she also indicated she was contracted to fight, probably in the women's  division.

Harrison made her MMA debut at PFL 2 on June 21, 2018, against Brittney Elkin in the Women's Lightweight division. She won via submission due to an armbar in the first round.

For her second professional fight, Harrison faced Jozette Cotton at PFL 6 on August 16, 2018. She won the fight via TKO in the third round.

Harrison was on the main card for PFL 11 in 2018 and defeated Moriel Charneski; after her victory, it appeared that she was not completely content with her own performance.

Her coach is Phil Daru.

PFL season 2019
Harrison was expected to headline the first event of PFL's second season against Svetlana Khautova on May 9, 2019. Khautova withdrew from the bout and was replaced by Larissa Pacheco. Harrison won the fight by unanimous decision.

Harrison faced Morgan Frier in the co-main event of PFL 4 on July 11, 2019. She won the fight by key lock submission in the first round. Subsequently, Harrison signed a new long-term contract extension with the PFL.

After becoming second in the preliminary round standing, Harrison secured a position at the playoffs. She was originally scheduled to face number 3 ranked Genah Fabian at PFL 7 on October 11, 2019, but Fabian was forced to pull out of the bout. Genah Fabian was replaced by number 5 Bobbi Jo Dalziel. Harrison would win the fight by an armbar in the first round.

Harrison faced Larissa Pacheco in rematch for the Women's Lightweight final at PFL 10 on December 31, 2019. After dominating every round with her superior grappling, Harrison won the fight by unanimous decision to win the 2019 Women's Lightweight Championship.

PFL season 2020
Harrison was expected to compete in the season 2020 of PFL, but the complete season was cancelled due to the COVID-19 pandemic.

PFL season 2021 
Kayla faced Mariana Morais on May 6, 2021, at PFL 3 for the start of the 2021 season. She won the bout via TKO in the first round.

Kayla faced Cindy Dandois on June 25, 2021, at PFL 6. She won the bout in the first round via an arm bar submission.

Kayla faced Genah Fabian in the Semifinals of the Women's Lightweight tournament on August 19, 2021, at PFL 8. She won the bout in the first round via TKO by way of ground and pound.

Kayla faced Taylor Guardado in the Finals of the Women's Lightweight tournament on October 27, 2021, at PFL 10. She won the bout via armbar in the second round.

PFL season 2022 
Harrison faced Marina Mokhnatkina on May 6, 2022, at PFL 3. She won the bout via unanimous decision.

Harrison was scheduled to face Julia Budd on July 1, 2022, at PFL 6. However, a week before the event, Budd pulled out due to injury and was replaced by Kaitlin Young. Harrison won the bout, with the referee stoppage at the 2:35 mark of the first round.

Harrison faced Martina Jindrová in the Semifinals off the Women's Lightweight tournament on August 20, 2022, at PFL 9. She won the bout in the first round via arm-triangle choke.

Harrison faced Larissa Pacheco for a third time in the finals of the Women's Lightweight tournament on November 25, 2022, at PFL 10. She lost the fight via unanimous decision.

Other promotions
With the 2020 PFL season cancelled, Harrison was handed a contract exemption to sign with the Invicta FC and made her debut in the Featherweight division against Courtney King at Invicta FC 43 on November 20, 2020. She won the fight via TKO in the second round.

Harrison was then expected to compete for Titan FC. She was scheduled to face Jozette Cotton in a rematch on December 17, 2020, at Titan FC 66. The day before the fight, Cotton was hospitalized due to a bad weight cut and the bout was cancelled.

Personal life
In 2020, Harrison acquired full custody of her niece Kyla and nephew Emery, after her stepfather – who had custody of the children at the time – died suddenly.

Television
Kayla Harrison has been a guest in episode 24 of season 6, and in episode 4 of season 7, of the television show Impractical Jokers.

She also appeared on an episode of Flea Market Flip with her grandmother.

Championships and accomplishments
Professional Fighters League
2019 PFL Women's Lightweight Championship
2021 PFL Women's Lightweight Championship

Mixed martial arts record

|-
|Loss
|align=center|15–1
|Larissa Pacheco
|Decision (unanimous)
|PFL 10
|
|align=center|5
|align=center|5:00
|New York City, New York, United States
|
|-
|Win
|align=center|15–0
|Martina Jindrová
|Submission (arm-triangle choke)
|PFL 9
|
|align=center|1
|align=center|3:17
|London, England
|
|-
|Win
|align=center|14–0
|Kaitlin Young
|TKO (punches)
|PFL 6
|
|align=center|1
|align=center|2:35
|Atlanta, Georgia, United States
|
|-
|Win
|align=center|13–0
|Marina Mokhnatkina
|Decision (unanimous)
|PFL 3
|
|align=center|3
|align=center|5:00
|Arlington, Texas, United States
|
|-
|Win
|align=center|12–0
|Taylor Guardado
|Submission (armbar)
|PFL 10 
|
|align=center|2
|align=center|4:00
|Hollywood, Florida, United States
|
|-
|Win
|align=center|11–0
|Genah Fabian
|TKO (punches)
|PFL 8 
|
|align=center|1
|align=center|4:01
|Hollywood, Florida, United States
|
|-
|Win
|align=center|10–0
|Cindy Dandois
|Submission (armbar)
|PFL 6
|
|align=center|1
|align=center|4:44
|Atlantic City, New Jersey, United States
|
|-
|Win
|align=center|9–0
|Mariana Morais
|TKO (punches)
|PFL 3
|
|align=center|1
|align=center|1:23
|Atlantic City, New Jersey, United States
|
|-
|Win
|align=center|8–0
|Courtney King
|TKO (punches)
|Invicta FC 43
|
|align=center|2
|align=center|4:48
|Kansas City, Kansas, United States
| 
|-
|Win
|align=center|7–0
|Larissa Pacheco	
|Decision (unanimous)
|PFL 10
|
|align=center|5
|align=center|5:00
|New York City, New York, United States
|
|-
|Win
|align=center|6–0
|Bobbi Jo Dalziel	
|Submission (armbar)
|PFL 7
|
|align=center|1
|align=center|3:32
|Las Vegas, Nevada, United States
|
|-
|Win
|align=center|5–0
|Morgan Frier	
|Submission (key lock)
|PFL 4
|
|align=center|1
|align=center|3:35
|Atlantic City, New Jersey, United States
|
|-
|Win
|align=center|4–0
|Larissa Pacheco		
|Decision (unanimous)
|PFL 1
|
|align=center|3
|align=center|5:00
|Uniondale, New York, United States
|
|-
|Win
|align=center|3–0
|Moriel Charneski
|TKO (punches)
|PFL 11
|
|align=center|1
|align=center|3:39
|New York City, New York, United States
|
|-
|Win
|align=center|2–0
|Jozette Cotton
|TKO (punches)
|PFL 6
|
|align=center|3
|align=center|1:24
|Atlantic City, New Jersey, United States
|
|-
|Win
|align=center|1–0
|Brittney Elkin
|Submission (armbar)
|PFL 2
|
|align=center|1
|align=center|3:18
|Chicago, Illinois, United States
|

Judo record
{| class="wikitable sortable" style="font-size:80%; text-align:left;"
|-
!  Result
!  style="text-align:center;"| Rec.
!  Opponent
!  Score
!  Event
!  Division
!  Date
!  Location
|-
|Win||style="text-align:center;"|45-7||  Audrey Tcheuméo|| 100-000 || rowspan=4|2016 Olympic Games || rowspan=4|-78 kg|| rowspan=4| || rowspan=4| Rio de Janeiro
|-
|Win||style="text-align:center;"|44-7||  Anamari Velenšek|| 100-000 
|-
|Win||style="text-align:center;"|43-7||  Abigél Joó|| 100-000 
|-
|Win||style="text-align:center;"|42-7||  Zhang Zhehui|| 100-000 
|-
|Win||style="text-align:center;"|41-7||  Mayra Aguiar || 100-000 || rowspan=3|2016 Pan American Championship || rowspan=3|-78 kg|| rowspan=3| || rowspan=3| Havana
|-
|Win||style="text-align:center;"|40-7||  Catherine Roberge || 100-000
|-
|Win||style="text-align:center;"|39-7||  Andrymar Alfonzo || 100-000
|-
|Loss||style="text-align:center;"|38-7||  Yoon Hyun-ji|| 000-010|| rowspan=2|2015 World Championship || rowspan=2|-78 kg|| rowspan=2| || rowspan=2| Astana
|-
|Win||style="text-align:center;"|38-6||  Mirla Nolberto|| 100-000 
|-
|Win||style="text-align:center;"|37-6||  Mayra Aguiar|| 100-000S1|| rowspan=3|2015 Pan American Games || rowspan=3|-78 kg|| rowspan=3| || rowspan=3| Toronto
|-
|Win||style="text-align:center;"|36-6||  Catherine Roberge|| 100-000S3
|-
|Win||style="text-align:center;"|35-6||  Mirla Nolberto|| 100-000
|-
|Loss||style="text-align:center;"|34-6||  Mayra Aguiar || 000-000 || rowspan=3|2015 Pan American Championship || rowspan=3|-78 kg|| rowspan=3| || rowspan=3| Edmonton
|-
|Win||style="text-align:center;"|34-5||  Catherine Roberge || 100-000
|-
|Win||style="text-align:center;"|33-5||  Myriam Gonzalez || 101-000
|-
|Win||style="text-align:center;"|32-5||  Yahima Ramirez|| 000-000 || rowspan=5|2014 World Championship || rowspan=5|-78 kg|| rowspan=5| || rowspan=5| Chelyabinsk
|-
|Loss||style="text-align:center;"|31-5||  Mayra Aguiar|| 001-011
|-
|Win||style="text-align:center;"|31-4||  Anamari Velenšek|| 100-000
|-
|Win||style="text-align:center;"|30-4||  Wang Szu-chu|| 101-000
|-
|Win||style="text-align:center;"|29-4||  Catherine Roberge|| 000-000
|-
|Win||style="text-align:center;"|28-4||  Vanessa Chala || || rowspan=5|2013 Pan American Championship || rowspan=5|-70 kg|| rowspan=5| || rowspan=5| San José
|-
|Win||style="text-align:center;"|27-4||  Alix Renaud Roy ||
|-
|Win||style="text-align:center;"|26-4||  Jenifer Ortiz ||
|-
|Loss||style="text-align:center;"|25-4||  Yuri Alvear ||
|-
|Win||style="text-align:center;"|25-3||  Elvismar Rodríguez ||
|-
|Win||style="text-align:center;"|24-3||  Gemma Gibbons|| 0020-0000 || rowspan=4|2012 Olympic Games || rowspan=4|-78 kg|| rowspan=4| || rowspan=4| London
|-
|Win||style="text-align:center;"|23-3||  Mayra Aguiar|| 1010-0000
|-
|Win||style="text-align:center;"|22-3||  Abigél Joó|| 1010-0100
|-
|Win||style="text-align:center;"|21-3||  Vera Moskalyuk|| 1000-0000
|-
|Win||style="text-align:center;"|20-3||  Catherine Roberge|| 011-001 || rowspan=3|2011 Pan American Games || rowspan=3|-78 kg|| rowspan=3| || rowspan=3| Guadalajara
|-
|Win||style="text-align:center;"|19-3||  Yalennis Castillo|| 002-001
|-
|Win||style="text-align:center;"|18-3||  Mayra Aguiar|| 001-000
|-
|Win||style="text-align:center;"|17-3||  Marhinde Verkerk|| 001-000 || rowspan=5|2011 World Championship || rowspan=5|-78 kg|| rowspan=5| || rowspan=5| Paris
|-
|Loss||style="text-align:center;"|16-3||  Audrey Tcheuméo|| 000-001 
|-
|Win||style="text-align:center;"|16-2||  Hitomi Ikeda|| 010-000 
|-
|Win||style="text-align:center;"|15-2||  Pürevjargalyn Lkhamdegd|| 101-000 
|-
|Win||style="text-align:center;"|14-2||  Catherine Roberge|| 001-000 
|-
|Win||style="text-align:center;"|13-2||  Mayra Aguiar|| 000-000 || rowspan=4|2011 Pan American Championship || rowspan=4|-78 kg|| rowspan=4| || rowspan=4| Guadalajara
|-
|Win||style="text-align:center;"|12-2||  Yalennis Castillo || 000-000
|-
|Win||style="text-align:center;"|11-2||  Nadjeda Gena || 102-000
|-
|Win||style="text-align:center;"|10-2||  Anny Cortés || 102-000
|-
|Win||style="text-align:center;"|9-2||  Mayra Aguiar|| 001-000 || rowspan=5|2010 World Championship || rowspan=5|-78 kg|| rowspan=5| || rowspan=5| Tokyo
|-
|Win||style="text-align:center;"|8-2||  Maryna Pryshchepa || 102-000
|-
|Win||style="text-align:center;"|7-2||  Céline Lebrun ||000-001
|-
|Win||style="text-align:center;"|6-2||  Ana Velensek ||100-000
|-
|Win||style="text-align:center;"|5-2||  Luise Malzahn || 003-000
|-
|Win||style="text-align:center;"|4-2||  Mirla Nolberto Labriel || 100-000 || rowspan=4|2010 Pan American Championship || rowspan=4|-78 kg|| rowspan=4| || rowspan=4| San Salvador
|-
|Win||style="text-align:center;"|3-2||  Keivi Pinto || 110-000
|-
|Loss||style="text-align:center;"|2-2||  Mayra Aguiar || 000-100
|-
|Win||style="text-align:center;"|2-1||  Lorena Briceño || 100-000
|-
|Loss||style="text-align:center;"|1-1||  Amy Cotton || 000-001 || rowspan=2|2009 World Championship || rowspan=2|-78 kg|| rowspan=2| || rowspan=5| Rotterdam
|-
|Win||style="text-align:center;"|1-0||  Samantha Lowe || 000-000

See also
 List of current PFL fighters
 List of female mixed martial artists

References

External links

 
 Kayla Harrison at US Judo Hall of Fame
 Kayla Harrison at PFL
 2012 Olympic −78 kg gold medal match: Kayla Harrison (United States) vs. Gemma Gibbons (United Kingdom) (International Olympic Committee on YouTube)
 Kayla Harrison at 

1990 births
American female judoka
Judoka at the 2011 Pan American Games
Judoka at the 2012 Summer Olympics
Judoka at the 2015 Pan American Games
Judoka at the 2016 Summer Olympics
Living people
Medalists at the 2012 Summer Olympics
Medalists at the 2016 Summer Olympics
Olympic gold medalists for the United States in Judo
Olympic judoka of the United States
Pan American Games gold medalists for the United States
Pan American Games medalists in judo
Sportspeople from Middletown, Ohio
Sportspeople from the Cincinnati metropolitan area
Lightweight mixed martial artists
American female mixed martial artists
Mixed martial artists utilizing judo
Medalists at the 2011 Pan American Games
Medalists at the 2015 Pan American Games
21st-century American women